Marian Gospodinov (born 6 July 1974) is a Bulgarian former football player who last played for Korinthos.

References

1974 births
Living people
Bulgarian footballers
Association football defenders
FC Lokomotiv 1929 Sofia players
Kalamata F.C. players
Ergotelis F.C. players
Aiolikos F.C. players
Ilisiakos F.C. players
Korinthos F.C. players
First Professional Football League (Bulgaria) players
People from Kazanlak